Illinois Route 59 is a north–south state highway in northeastern Illinois. It runs south from Illinois Route 173 in Antioch to I-55 in Shorewood, spanning the north–south width of Chicago's western suburbs.

Route description 

It is especially congested in the suburbs of Aurora and Naperville, where traffic counts average 40,000-55,000 vehicles per day. To accommodate the congestion, the 7.5-mile stretch between Ferry Road and 95th Street has been widened to six lanes. Most portions along IL 59 are zoned for commercial uses, however there are extensive stretches of residential areas along the road in West Chicago, Barrington, and Fox Lake Hills. IL 59 is the only numbered highway with a Metra station named after it: the Route 59 station on the BNSF line, which differentiates the station from the Naperville and Aurora stations.

IL 59 is called Fox Lake Road in Fox Lake Hills, Grand Avenue in portions of Ingleside and eastern Fox Lake, Sutton Road from South Barrington to Bartlett, Neltnor Boulevard in West Chicago, Hough Street in Barrington, and Brook Forest Avenue and Cottage Street in Shorewood.

IL 59 overlaps U.S. Route 12 (Rand Road) between Wauconda and Fox Lake.

In almost every town or village spanning IL 59, retail development and residential sprawl can be found. The IL 59 corridor includes regional shopping areas in the Naperville/Aurora area, the Hoffman Estates/South Barrington/Streamwood area, the Plainfield area, and the Joliet/Shorewood area. The IL 59 corridor also includes large community retail areas in Volo/Fox Lake, Wauconda, Bartlett, West Chicago, and Warrenville. IL 59 also travels through the Barrington Historic District and is proximate to significant office complexes and job centers at its junctions with Interstate 90 and Interstate 88; these intersecting corridors of commerce are known as the Golden Corridor and the Illinois Technology and Research Corridor respectively. The regional shopping malls Westfield Fox Valley in Aurora and The Arboretum of South Barrington can also be found along the IL 59 corridor.

History 
SBI Route 59 ran from Joliet to Antioch on the current IL 59. IL 59 was replaced by U.S. Route 66 as U.S. 66 made its way onto a new highway in 1940; by 1957, IL 59 had been returned to its original state.

The Illinois Department of Transportation opened a diverging diamond interchange at IL 59 and Interstate 88 in September 2015.

Major intersections

References

External links

 Illinois Highway Ends: Illinois Route 59

State highways in Illinois
U.S. Route 66 in Illinois
Illinois Route 59
Illinois Route 59
Illinois Route 59
Illinois Route 59